Charles Karumi Maina (born 17 August 1991), known professionally as Charlie Karumi, is a Kenyan actor and Radio(NRG Radio)/TV presenter. He has appeared in several plays, television series and films. He is best known for his role as Tony on Kenyan drama Jane and Abel and for hosting entertainment magazine show Arena 254 on K24.

Charlie was born on 17th August, 1991 in Nairobi, Kenya and grew up in Uthiru. He attended Alliance high school where his love for stage was born through the school drama club.

He later joined Strathmore university for a degree in Business Information Technology and ended up kick starting his acting career. He landed his first acting role in the Kenyan TV series;Changes.

He has since featured in more films including; Lies that bind, Nairobi Half Life, Rush and Noose of Gold.

In 2015,he won the Kalasha awards for the best supporting actor for the comedy, 'Fundi-mentals'.

Early life 
Karumi was born on the 17th of August, 1991 in Nairobi and grew up in the neighborhood of Uthiru on the outskirts of the city. He began his education at Genesis Primary School in Uthiru, later transferring to Visa Oshwal Primary in Westlands and finally White Cottage Primary in Gachie where he sat his Kenya Certificate of Primary Education (KCPE) exams in 2005. He then proceeded to Alliance High School in Kikuyu for his secondary education sitting for his Kenya Certificate of Secondary Education (KCSE) exams in 2008. It was while at Alliance High that he discovered his love for the stage, joining the school's drama club 'The Dramatics Society' and landing roles in 2 of the club's national award-winning plays.

In 2009, he joined Strathmore University, Nairobi, and pursued a bachelor's degree in Business Information Technology (BBIT) graduating in April 2013.

Career 
Karumi's professional career kicked off while in University at Strathmore. He got his first paying role on Kenyan TV series Changes.

In 2009, he joined renown Kenyan repertoire theater Phoenix Players where he trained and starred in several of the group's plays. With that training, he began his career in earnest booking roles on several Kenyan television and film productions such as Higher Learning, Lies That Bind, Nairobi Half Life, Noose of Gold and Rush.

In 2014, he starred alongside Mumbi Maina, Brian Ogola, Lizz Njagah and Sarah Hassan on Maisha Magic East Drama Jane and Abel.

In 2015 he starred alongside Gerald Langiri on comedy Fundi-Mentals, a role that saw him clinch the 2015 Kalasha Award for Best Supporting Actor.

In 2015, Karumi ventured into TV hosting, taking part in the KTN The Presenter Season 2 talent search finishing in the final 10. A year later, he successfully auditioned for and took part in TLC's Africa wide talent search, TLC's Next Great Presenter. He emerged 2nd Runners Up after a successful campaign that saw him reach the final stage of the competition.

In 2017, he hosted entertainment magazine show Arena 254 on K24 before booking a role in South Africa in upcoming Danish Broadcasting Corporation TV Series Liberty, a screen adaptation of Jakob Ejersbo's book by the same name.

in 2021, Charlie started working at Homeboyz Radio on the breakfast show with G money as his co host after quitting NRG Radio.

Vlogging 

Charlie is also a regular vlogger, sharing his vlog series titled ''Charlie's Day Out'.

Filmography

Films

TV Series

Awards

References 

1991 births
Living people
21st-century Kenyan male actors
Kenyan male film actors
Kenyan male television actors
People from Nairobi